Frederick Hilton (born 8 July 1903) was an English professional footballer who played as a wing half.

References

1903 births
Footballers from Sheffield
English footballers
Association football wing halves
Lopham Street F.C. players
Grimsby Town F.C. players
Notts County F.C. players
Scunthorpe United F.C. players
Gainsborough Trinity F.C. players
Lincoln Wednesday F.C. players
English Football League players
Year of death missing